Faull may refer to:

 Cecil Faull (1930–2012), Dean of Leighlin, Ireland
 Ellen Faull (1918–2008), operatic soprano
 Greg Faull (born 1969), Australian rules footballer
 Jo-Anne Faull (born 1971), tennis player
 John Faull (born 1933), rugby player
 Jonathan Faull (born 1954), official
Margaret Faull (born 1946), museum director and archaeologist
 Martin Faull (born 1968), cricketer
 Viv Faull (born 1955), Bishop-designate of Bristol, Dean of York, Provost/Dean of Leicester

See also
 Aaron Faulls (born 1975), television personality
 David McFaull (1948–1997), sailor in the 1976 Summer Olympics